WEGB (90.7 FM, "Faith FM") is a radio station licensed to Napeague, New York and serves eastern Long Island. It broadcasts a Christian radio format and is under ownership of the Community Bible Church.

The station was assigned the current WEGB call letters by the Federal Communications Commission on February 13, 2009 and began broadcasting on October 6, 2011.

Simulcasts 
WEGB's programming is simulcast on 91.7 FM WEGQ which broadcasts from Quogue, New York, and a translator, W227AN (93.3 FM) in Southampton, New York.

Former callsign 
For unclear reasons, the Federal Communications Commission (FCC) unusually granted the station's initial Construction Permit a "K" call sign of KCBE on October 23, 2008. Since 1923, FCC policy has been to grant call signs beginning with a "K" to stations with a community of license west of the Mississippi River. Most other stations east of the Mississippi beginning with a "K", including KYW in Philadelphia and KDKA in Pittsburgh, date back to previous policy that assigned all land stations "K" call signs. The FCC has also granted improper "K" call signs due to clerical errors, most notably KTGG in Spring Arbor, Michigan.

References

External links 
 

 
 

Radio stations established in 2011
Mass media in Suffolk County, New York
EGB
2011 establishments in New York (state)